Richard Bertram Dolley (3 March 1960 – 30 June 2021) was a South African cricketer, educator, cricket and hockey administrator. He played in 36 first-class matches between 1982/83 and 1990/91 for the Eastern Province. His nephew Josh Dolley, brother Gary Dolley, sons Corbyn Dolley and Brad Dolley all have represented Eastern Province cricket team in domestic circuit.

Career 
Dolley made a mark in domestic competitions featuring for Eastern Province team scoring 1150 runs and taking 100 wickets in his first-class career. His cricket career ended just at a time when the unity process was negotiated and completed.

He also served as director of Eastern Province Cricket and then he also served as the chairman of Cricket Committee of Eastern Province as well as served in the Board of Eastern Province Cricket as an executive member. He later served as a deputy principal at the Westering High School in Port Elizabeth where he also coached both cricket and hockey to the students.

Death 
He died on 30 June 2021, at the age of 61 due to COVID-19.

References

External links 

 
 

1960 births
2021 deaths
South African cricketers
South African cricket administrators
South African educators
Eastern Province cricketers
Cricketers from Port Elizabeth
People from the Eastern Cape
Deaths from the COVID-19 pandemic in South Africa